Madoc is a township in Hastings County in  Eastern Ontario, Canada.

The township was named after legendary Welsh prince Madoc ap Owain Gwynedd, credited by some with discovering North America in 1170. There exists an alternative explanation, for which no evidence exists, that the name comes from a small Welsh village, Llanmadoc on the Gower Peninsula of Wales, not far from the city of Swansea.  Its post office dates from 1836.

Communities
The township of Madoc comprises a number of villages and hamlets, including the following communities such as Allen, Bannockburn, Cooper, Eldorado, Fox Corners, Hazzards Corners, Keller Bridge, Rimington; Empey

History

Mills and ironworks gave initial stimulus to the community of Madoc. Following the discovery of gold-bearing quartz in 1866, the community prospered as an industrial centre. Eldorado, 6 miles north of Madoc, was the site of Ontario's first gold rush on 18 August 1866 by Marcus Powell and William Berryman (or Nicholas Snider). The opened up a limestone cave 12 feet long, 6 feet wide and 6 feet high.  The resultant mine was named the Richardson Mine, after John Richardson, owner of the farm where it was located.  People soon came from all over North America to this area.

Demographics 

Notable people 

 Charles Wilson Cross – Canadian politician.  First Attorney-General of Alberta (1912–1918)

See also
List of townships in Ontario

References

External links

Township municipalities in Ontario
Lower-tier municipalities in Ontario
Municipalities in Hastings County